Pebbles, Volume 9 may refer to:

Pebbles, Volume 9 (1980 album)
Pebbles, Volume 9 (1996 album)